"It's Tricky" is the fourth single released from Run-DMC's third album, Raising Hell. It was released early in 1987 through Profile Records and was co-produced by Rick Rubin and the group themselves. The song peaked at  57 on the US Billboard Hot 100 and No. 21 on the Hot R&B/Hip-Hop Songs. In the UK, the song reached No. 16 on the UK Singles Chart. Two decades after the song's release, the Knack sued Run-DMC on the grounds that "It's Tricky" sampled their song "My Sharona" without permission.

In 1998, American producer Jason Nevins remixed the song under the amended title "(It's) Tricky". This version peaked at No. 74 in the UK while Nevins' remix of Run-DMC's song "It's Like That" spent its fifth week at No. 1 on the UK Singles Chart. Nevins' remix also achieved top-40 placings in continental Europe, Australia, and New Zealand.

Background
Run-D.M.C's previous studio album King of Rock had established the group's fusion of hip-hop and hard rock (as well as their cover of Walk This Way by Aerosmith),  which blossomed on Raising Hell. This was due in part to the presence of Rick Rubin as their record producer. Rubin had an affinity for metal and rap in equal measures and he knew how to play to the strengths of both. At the same time, he slipped in commercial concessions that came off as sly even when they borrowed from familiar songs, such as "My Sharona" on the single "It's Tricky." The song contains samples of "My Sharona" by the Knack, as well as the entire vocal structure from "Mickey" by Toni Basil. The Knack sued Run-DMC over the track in 2006, and the lawsuit was settled out of court.

Critical reception
Rolling Stone writer Mark Kemp remarked, "'It's Tricky' cribs the guitar part from the Knack's 'My Sharona,' a fatuous New Wave song, and turns it into vital street art." Pitchforks Tom Breihan claimed, "Run and DMC had also stepped their rap game up; "It's Tricky" is basically as good as the two of them ever got, spitting quick-tongue witticisms and yelling booming threats with equal abandon." Time writer stated the song serves "to prove their ferocity." Commenting on the crossover appeal, AllMusics stated, "Rubin loved metal and rap in equal measures and he knew how to play to the strengths of both, while slipping in commercial concessions that seemed sly even when they borrowed from songs as familiar as 'My Sharona.'"

Music video 
The music video features Penn and Teller hustling a group of people with a game of three-card Monte in front of the Rialto Theater in downtown Los Angeles. Run-DMC are called and shut their business down by winning every hand they play. Penn then asks the group if they can teach them to dance, which they do after insisting that Penn and Teller change their clothes. Six months later, Run-DMC show up for their gig in Japan, but are denied entry as Penn and Teller are already on stage impersonating them.

Usage in media
The song is used in the promotional clip for the FX television series Snowfall, which began airing in July 2017. The original song appeared in the movies Road Trip, Can't Hardly Wait, Turbo, White Chicks, The Bounty Hunter, The Boss Baby: Family Business, Sonic the Hedgehog 2, in the television show One Tree Hill, and in the video games WWE 2K16, Forza Horizon 3, and SSX series, SSX Tricky in particular, being named after the song. In 2021, the song was sampled by Crazy Frog.

Track listing
7-inch
A. "It's Tricky" – 3:02
B. "Proud to Be Black" – 3:14

12-inch
A1. "It's Tricky" (Club Mix) – 7:19
A2. "Up Tempo" – 2:35
B1. "It's Tricky" (Remix) – 4:31
B2. "It's Tricky" (Scratchapella) – 3:51
B3. "Tricky Reprise" – 2:54
B4. "Proud to Be Black" – 3:14

Charts

Weekly charts
Original version

Jason Nevins remix

Year-end charts
Jason Nevins remix

Certifications

References

External links
 

1986 singles
1986 songs
Profile Records singles
Run-DMC songs
Sampling controversies
Song recordings produced by Rick Rubin
Songs written by Darryl McDaniels
Songs written by Joseph Simmons
Songs written by Doug Fieger